Paterson's curse (Echium plantagineum) is an invasive plant species in Australia. The name Salvation Jane originated from, and is mostly used in, South Australia due to its use as a  source of food for grazing animals when the less drought-tolerant grazing pastures die off. Other names are blueweed, Lady Campbell weed, Riverina bluebell, and purple viper's bugloss.

Three other Echium species have been introduced and are of concern; viper's bugloss (Echium vulgare) is the most common of them. Viper's bugloss is biennial, with a single unbranched flowering stem and smaller, more blue flowers, but is otherwise similar. This species is also useful for honey production.

Paterson's curse has positive uses; as a fodder plant, with proper handling, it can be valuable fodder over summer for cattle and sheep, but not livestock without ruminant digestive systems.

History
In the 1880s, it was introduced to Australia, probably both as an accidental contaminant of pasture seed and as an ornamental plant. Reportedly, both names for the plant derive from Jane Paterson or Patterson, an early settler of the country near Albury. She brought the first seeds from Europe to beautify a garden, and then could only watch helplessly as the weed infested previously productive pastures for many miles around.

Paterson's curse is now a dominant broadleaf pasture weed through much of New South Wales, the Australian Capital Territory, Victoria, South Australia, and Tasmania and also infests native grasslands, heathlands, and woodlands.

Description

Appearance
The plant has hairy, dark green, broadly oval rosette leaves to 30 cm long. The several seeding stems grow to 120 cm in height and develop branches with age. Flowers develop in clusters; they are purple, tubular and 2–3 cm long with five petals. It has a fleshy taproot with smaller laterals.

Growth
Although generally an autumn-germinating, spring-flowering annual, Paterson's curse has become highly adaptable to Australian erratic rainfall events, and given suitable rainfall, some plants germinate at any time of year, but the plant never survives for more than one year. It is a very prolific seed producer; heavy infestations can yield up to 30 000 seeds/m2. Paterson's curse can germinate under a wide variety of temperature conditions, tolerates dry periods well, and responds vigorously to fertiliser. If cut by a lawnmower, it quickly recovers and sends out new shoots and flowers.

The plant disperses by movement of seeds — on the wool or fur of animals, the alimentary tracts of grazing animals or birds, movement in water, and most importantly as a contaminant of hay or grain. This is most noticeable in times of drought, when considerable movement of fodder and livestock occurs.

It can rapidly establish a large population on disturbed ground and competes vigorously with both smaller plants and the seedlings of regenerating overstorey species. Its spread has been greatly aided by human-induced habitat degradation, particularly the removal of perennial grasses through overgrazing by sheep and cattle and the introduction of the rabbit. Paterson's curse is rarely able to establish itself in habitats where the native vegetation is healthy and undisturbed.

Control

Chemical
Control of the plant is carried out by hand (for small infestations) or with any of a variety of herbicides, and must be continued over many years to reduce the seedbank. (Most seeds germinate in the first year, but some survive for as long as five years before germinating.) In the longer term, perennial grasses (which do not need to regenerate from seed each year) can outcompete Paterson's curse, and any increase in perennial cover produces a direct decrease in it. However, the annual cost in control measures and lost production in Australia was estimated (in a 1985 study by the Industries Assistance Commission) to be over $30 million, compared to $2 million per year in benefits.

Biological
The Australian Commonwealth Scientific and Industrial Research Organisation (CSIRO) has carried out research on numerous classical biological control solutions, and of the 100-odd insects found feeding on Paterson's curse in the Mediterranean, judged six safe to release in Australia without endangering crops or native plants. The leaf-mining moth Dialectica scalariella, the crown weevil Mogulones larvatus, root weevil Mogulones geographicus, and flea beetle Longitarsus echii are now currently widely distributed in southern Australia and can be found easily on most large Paterson's curse plants encountered. The crown weevil and flea beetle are proving highly effective. While the CSIRO is cautiously optimistic,  biological control agents are expected to take many years to be fully effective. The most recent economic analysis, however, suggests that biological control has already brought nearly $1.2 B in benefits to Australia by reducing the amount of Paterson's curse in pastures. Investment into the biological control of Paterson's curse has already reaped a benefit cost ratio of 52:1.

Toxicity
E. plantagineum contains pyrrolizidine alkaloids and is poisonous. When eaten in large quantities, it causes reduced livestock weight or even (in severe cases) death. Paterson's curse can kill horses and irritate the udders of dairy cows and the skin of humans. After the 2003 Canberra bushfires, over 40 horses were recorded as put down after eating the weed.

See also
Invasive species in Australia

References

External links
 Paterson's curse, Echium plantagineum Biological control research in CSIRO Entomology
 Echium plantagineum L.  FloraBase - the Western Australian Flora

Invasive plant species in Australia
plantagineum in Australia
Veterinary toxicology